Niels Andersen may refer to:

 Niels Andersen (sport shooter) (1867–1930), Danish sport shooter
 Niels Andersen (actor) (born 1942), Danish actor
 Niels Erik Andersen (born 1945), Danish football player
 Niels Andersen (businessman) (1835–1911), Danish businessman and politician
 Niels Siggaard Andersen, Danish and later Norwegian curler